Ishgah may refer to:
 Ishgah, Lahijan
 Ishgah, Rudboneh, Lahijan County